Centennial Logger is an outdoor 2004 bronze sculpture by Jerry Werner, installed along Reed Market Road in Bend, Oregon, in the United States. The statue commemorates the city's centennial anniversary, along with the sculpture Centennial Planter, and depicts a lumberjack holding an axe.

See also

 2004 in art
 List of public art in Bend, Oregon

References

External links
 

2004 establishments in Oregon
2004 sculptures
Bronze sculptures in Oregon
Outdoor sculptures in Oregon
Sculptures of men in Oregon
Statues in Oregon